Coal City University (CCU) is a private, non-profit co-educational university in southeastern Nigeria. It is located in the city of Enugu, the capital and largest city of Enugu State. The university has two campuses — one at Emene and the other at Independence Layout, that spread over 432 acres of land. The university currently has over 800 students in its 10 faculties established in 2016.

References

External links

Enugu
Universities and colleges in Nigeria
Private universities and colleges in Nigeria